Al-Khor Sport Club, is an Iraqi football team based in Khor Al Zubair, Basra, that plays in Iraq Division Three.

Managerial history
  Hadeer Al-Asadi

See also 
 2000–01 Iraqi Elite League

References

External links
 Iraq Clubs- Foundation Dates
 Basra Clubs Union

Football clubs in Iraq
1993 establishments in Iraq
Association football clubs established in 1993
Football clubs in Basra
Basra